"Kissing Strangers" is a song by American band DNCE, featuring vocals from Trinidadian rapper Nicki Minaj. It was released to digital retailers on April 14, 2017, through Republic Records as the lead single from the bonus edition of the band's self-titled debut studio album. On July 28, 2017, a Spanglish remix with Luis Fonsi was released. The lead singer of the band, Joe Jonas, sings in both versions.

Background
On April 6, 2017, the band posted a picture of Doug the Pug including a phone number listed on his dog tag, if dialed, an instrumental chorus of "Kissing Strangers" will be offered. DNCE and Nicki Minaj teased the collaboration via social media on April 10, 2017. Nicki Minaj revealed photos from the music video, while DNCE released a preview of the song, with an early snippet offered by dialing a phone number.

In an interview by CBS Radio, Joe Jonas of DNCE said: "'Kissing Strangers' is a song about having fun with a stranger, getting to know them a little better, [and then] they're no longer a stranger. Just finding yourself; finding who you want to be with."

"We have the amazing, beautiful, talented Nicki Minaj on the track as well. We shot the music video in L.A. a week ago, and we can't wait to share that." Jonas continued. "We're huge fans of her work, and it was an immediate thought to have her be a part of the song, so we sent her the track, she wrote her verse in like, five minutes, and came out exactly how we'd hopes and she kills it... in the best way."

"I'm really proud of 'Kissing Strangers,'" Justin Tranter, co-writer of the song, told Billboard magazine. "The chorus is about being open-minded to the love that might be in front of you." Cole Whittle said: "I've been working with Justin since we were kids, he's like family to us. He introduced Joe and I, so he's a big part of why DNCE exists."

Music video
Shortly after the song was released, the band posted a teaser of the music video on social media. The teaser is a behind-the-scenes exclusive look at the video production.

The music video was released on May 12, 2017 via Vevo on DNCE's YouTube channel. It was directed by American music video director Marc Klasfeld, and included all DNCE members and Nicki Minaj. In the video, DNCE holds a house party. It starts with an innocent game of spin the bottle, then Nicki Minaj walks through the door, and is invited by Jonas to get up to the stage with him. She drops the microphone and grabbed Jonas by his collar, then puts her lips close to his lips.

Live performances
On May 8, 2017, DNCE made their major performance debut of "Kissing Strangers" at the 28th GLAAD Media Awards in New York City, alongside their 2016 song "Cake by the Ocean". "The GLAAD Media Awards is an incredible ceremony," Joe Jonas told Billboard magazine at the event. "To be part of something like this, and to play this song — to have fun and celebrate, that's what it's about." On May 16, 2017, the band performed the track in the elimination episode of The Voice, it ended with dozens of lip-shaped balloons falling down on the band. On July 6, 2017, DNCE performed the song at Univision's Premios Juventud 2017, the annual youth awards. It marks their first-ever performance on Spanish-language television.

Track listing

Credits and personnel
Credits adapted from Tidal.
 Justin Drew Tranter – composer, lyricist, background vocalist
 Mattman & Robin – composer, lyricist, producer, background vocalist, bassist, clapper, drummer, guitarist, maracas player, percussion player, programmer, tambourine player
 Nicki Minaj – composer, lyricist
 Joe Jonas –  composer, principal vocalist
 Jack Lawless – background vocalist, drummer
 JinJoo Lee – background vocalist, guitarist
 Cole Whittle – background vocalist, bassist
 Serban Ghenea – mixer

Charts

Weekly charts

Year-end charts

Certifications

Release history

References

2017 singles
2017 songs
DNCE songs
Nicki Minaj songs
Songs written by Nicki Minaj
Republic Records singles
Songs written by Justin Tranter
Songs written by Robin Fredriksson
Songs written by Mattias Larsson
Song recordings produced by Mattman & Robin
Number-one singles in Russia
Songs about kissing